DevEco Studio is the official integrated development environment (IDE) for Huawei's HarmonyOS operating system, built on JetBrains' IntelliJ IDEA software and Huawei's SmartAssist designed specifically for HarmonyOS development. It is available for download on Windows 10 and macOS based operating systems.

DevEco Studio was launched on September 9, 2020, a day before Huawei Developer Conference 2020 (HDC 2020) as the first stable build starting from version 1.0 for Huawei Vision TVs on HarmonyOS 1 and HarmonyOS 2 Beta versions for phones, tablets and watches.

On July 8, 2022, after the following release of DevEco Studio 3.0 Beta 4 JS/eTS replaced Java as Huawei's preferred language for HarmonyOS app development since HarmonyOS .hap apps don't support Java language on API8 for HarmonyOS 3.0  as Huawei plans to release its own Cangjie programming language sometime in 2022 for HarmonyOS which is equivalent to Google's Kotlin for Android platforms. Java is still supported, as is C++ on older API level versions of the previous versions of HarmonyOS 2.0.

Features 
The following features are provided in the current stable version:
HarmonyOS DevEco Studio 2.1 current version released June 2, 2021 on HarmonyOS 2 launch has cross-device project templates, atomic service development and more on support for building TV, smartphones, tablets, watches, routers, IoT devices.

New cross-device engineering template 
 The new version of DevEco Studio comes with new 11 cross-device project templates founded on the original single-device project template. The developer can select the template and device type in sequence for a particular project.
 Easier to create cross-device projects for the developers, and automatically produce example codes and related supplies.

Support for atomization service development 
 DevEco Studio 2.1 version added the support for atomic service developments to explore its scope in the coming days. Now the process became easier to quickly complete the atomic service project.
 The developer only has to select the desired project template, perform the coding development process, after that, the code compilation, and at last the debugging test.
 The project creation menu has several major changes in the latest version. In the current version, developers have to select the project template first, and then select the supported device type.
 A new “Service” option has been installed in the project type, used in creating an atomic service project. 
 The “Show in Service Center” button will help in finding the service center of the device during creating the atomic project.

Support for router devices 
 After installation of the DevEco Studio 2.1 version, developers can JS language to quickly develop applications that can run on router devices. The new release has a router single device project template to provide support for routers.

As of now, the DevEco Studio provides supports for eight kinds of different mechanisms. It includes smartphones, tablets, automotive machines, smart screens, smart wearables,  lightweight smart accessories, smart vision, and routers.

Support Sample Project Import 
 The HarmonyOS sample application is used by the IDE developers for a fast understanding of or application areas of various APIs. It makes easier to create designs and build the application quickly.
 The new version of this development tool supports sample project import that allows developers to automatically import the Sample project into DevEco Studio. Developer can access sample projects codes via the “Import HarmonyOS Sample” button.

A  new distributed simulator 
 The DevEco Studio 2.1 has been com with a new distributed simulator with more enhanced functions. It's one of the important remote emulators, which demand login permission in the iteration of each hour. If the session has been expired, it inevitably asks for the re-request/login for the session. This distributed simulator helps the developers to test the distributed functions of an application.

This current release has been fixed issues that occurred in previous version, also enhanced the existing features.

Enhanced features and Fixed Issues 
Optimize the download of HarmonyOS SDK: When DevEco Studio is installed for the first time, Java SDK, JS SDK, Toolchains, Previewer will be downloaded by default
Enhanced application signature capabilities: support for commissioning application automation signatures, and support for storing application signature information through configuration files
Java editor capability enhancement: through the integration of HuaweiCloud SmartAssist to provide smarter code completion capabilities
Previewer capability enhancement: support XML file preview under qualifier directory, previewer image transmission, real-time preview performance optimization
Service Widget enhancement: support card development for Wearable devices, and add multiple card templates
Compilation and construction Performance: improve the compilation and construction speed of Hap/App
Display Optimisations: improved HiLog log output results, and support filtering
Har supports: C++ shared library construction and use.

Once an HarmonyOS app has been compiled with DevEco Studio, it can be published on Huawei AppGallery. Like with Android apps on Android Studio for Huawei's AppGallery, HarmonyOS applications has to be in line with  Huawei AppGallery Review Guidelines.

DevEco Service 
DevEco Service provides feature-packed cloud service center that allows developers to experience a wide range of development scenarios online, share development resources, and test your applications and services in a comprehensive way, within 24/7 remote laboratory environments. You'll get access to key insights when developing and releasing premium products. It includes the DevEco Marketplace.

DevEco Marketplace 
The DevEco Marketplace which was launched on September 25, 2021 that allows developers access to various development resources here including native libraries, third-party libraries, sample codes, and more., which can make app development of Super Device hardware and atomic services easier to implement into native based HarmonyOS apps.

HarmonyOS DevEco Marketplace polymerization a wealth of ecosystem resources development kits, enabling developers to easily obtain the resources needed one-stop, easy to complete the development of Hong Meng-chi of hardware, atomic services, and applications.

The DevEco Marketplace website divides resources into two categories, which are displayed on the following two pages: “Device Components” page: Resource library for device developers, providing release and component package resources.
 
The marketplace includes System Bundles such as a wide array of system capabilities such as kernel, drivers, and service framework bundles. Atomic Services section that includes in typical scenarios which includes security, multimedia, and network atomic services. Project Templates section that includes Application development project templates for Super Device and various devices, covering various typical industry use cases and Code Samples of API code samples and typical scenarios for HarmonyOS apps.

Version history 
The following is a list of DevEco Studio's major releases:

System requirements 

These features includes requirements for IDE + HarmonyOS SDK + HarmonyOS Emulator.

References

Integrated development environments
Programming tools for Windows
MacOS programming tools
Huawei products